Izhma may refer to:
Izhma, Komi Republic, a rural locality (a selo) in the Komi Republic, Russia
Izhma, Nizhny Novgorod Oblast, a rural locality (a settlement) in Nizhny Novgorod Oblast, Russia
Izhma Airport, an airport in the Komi Republic, Russia
Izhma, name of the town of Sosnogorsk in the Komi Republic, Russia, until 1957
Izhma River, a tributary of the Pechora River

See also
Izhma Komi, an ethnic group of the Komi people